Cardfight!! Vanguard Prime is a 2018–19 anime television series that is a reboot of the Cardfight!! Vanguard manga story by Akira Ito. It is the first season of Cardfight!! Vanguard Prime and the tenth season overall in the Cardfight!! Vanguard series. The 52 episodes were released to the Japanese website AbemaTV from May 5, 2018 to May 4, 2019 at 9.00pm JST on Saturdays, and were then broadcast on the TV station Tokyo MX at 10.30pm JST on the same night. The episodes are also uploaded simultaneously with English subtitles through the official YouTube channel and Crunchyroll.

Plot
Aichi Sendou is a timid and mundane third-year middle school boy. The thing that supported Aichi's heart, was the "Blaster Blade" card that he received as a child. It's an important rare card from "Vanguard", a card game with the imaginary world of "Planet Cray" as its stage. From the day he reunited with the person who gave him that card "Toshiki Kai", Aichi's everyday life began to change.

While expanding his horizons and meeting many different fighters, Aichi has a mysterious experience of hearing the voices of units from Planet Cray--- that closely resembles Psyqualia, the power held by "Ren Suzugamori", the leader of Team Asteroid.

It's a youthful story of vanguard fighters who clash passionately with each other through fights.

Theme song

Openings
"Legendary" by Roselia (eps 1–26)
"Destiny Calls" by Team Ultra-Rare (eps 27–52)
"INVINCIBLE FIGHTER" by Raise A Suilen (VD eps 1–??)

Endings
"GIFT from THE FIGHT!!" by Tsubasa Yonaga & Takuya Satō (Japanese), Jovette Rivera (English) (eps 1–12)
"Triangle Massage" by Tsubasa Yonaga, Takuya Sato & Atsushi Abe (eps 13–26)
"Mainichi Climax ☆" by Milky Holmes (eps 27–38)
"UNSTOPPABLE" by Raise A Suilen (eps 39–52)
"Takin' my Heart" by Raise A Suilen (VD eps 1–??)

Episode list

References

Cardfight!! Vanguard
2018 Japanese television seasons
2019 Japanese television seasons